"Going Out of My Mind" is a song written by Terry McBride and Kostas, and recorded by American country music group McBride & the Ride. It was released in July 1992 as the second single from their album Sacred Ground. The song reached number 5 on the Billboard Hot Country Singles & Tracks chart.

Critical reception
Deborah Evans Price, of Billboard magazine reviewed the song favorably, saying that the song is "smoothly performed" and that it showcases the bands "sturdy harmonies." She goes on to call the production, "light and airy" and that the repetitious chorus line is difficult to forget.

Music video 
The music video for "Going Out of My Mind" was directed, produced, and filmed by Sherman Halsey.

Chart performance
"Going Out of My Mind" debuted at number 71 on the U.S. Billboard Hot Country Singles & Tracks for the week of July 18, 1992.

Year-end charts

References

1992 singles
McBride & the Ride songs
Songs written by Kostas (songwriter)
Songs written by Terry McBride (musician)
Song recordings produced by Tony Brown (record producer)
Music videos directed by Sherman Halsey
MCA Records singles
1992 songs